Atchara (also spelled achara or atsara) is a pickle made from grated unripe papaya originating from the Philippines. This dish is often served as a side dish for fried or grilled foods such as pork barbecue.

History

The name atchara originated from the Indian achar, which was transmitted to the Philippines via the acar of the Indonesia, Malaysia, and Brunei.

Preparation
The primary ingredient is grated unripe papaya. Carrot slices, julienned ginger, bell pepper, onion and garlic make up the other vegetables. Raisins or pineapple chunks may be added, and chilis, freshly ground black pepper, red pepper flakes, or whole peppercorns complete the mixture. These are then mixed in a solution of vinegar, sugar/syrup, and salt preserves.

The mixture is placed in airtight jars where it will keep without refrigeration, however once opened it is preferably kept chilled to maintain its flavour.

Variants

Atcharang maasim (sour pickles) - is prepared in the same way as normal Atchara except that no sugar is added.
Atcharang labóng (pickled bamboo shoots) - are prepared in the same way as Atchara, but use bamboo shoots instead of papaya.
Atcharang dampalit (pickled sea purslane) - made from Sesuvium portulacastrum, called dampalit in Tagalog.
Atcharang ubod (pickled palm hearts) - made from palm hearts, called ubod in Tagalog.
Atcharang sayote (pickled chayote) - made from chayote, bell pepper, carrots, and ginger.

See also
Philippine condiments

References

Fermented foods
Pickles
Philippine condiments
Papaya dishes